Cleveland “Cleve” Sellers Jr. (born November 8, 1944) is an American educator and civil rights activist.

During the Civil Rights Movement, Sellers helped lead the Student Nonviolent Coordinating Committee. He was the only person convicted and jailed for events at the Orangeburg Massacre, a 1968 civil rights protest in which three students were killed by state troopers. Sellers' conviction and the acquittal of the other nine defendants was believed to be motivated by racism, and Sellers received a full pardon 25 years after the incident.

Sellers is the former Director of the African American Studies Program at the University of South Carolina. He served as president of Voorhees College, a historically black college in South Carolina, from 2008 to 2015.

Early life
Sellers was born in Denmark, South Carolina, to Cleveland Sellers (Sr.) and Pauline Sellers. Denmark was a town of mostly black residents, so much so, that as a child, Sellers was often blind to the privilege of whites. He said, "as far as I was concerned, white people didn't constitute a threat or deterrent to anything I wanted to be or accomplish." He began attending the Voorhees School when he was three and served as its mascot. Growing up, Sellers had a great relationship with his parents, especially his mother. He admired her care for the community and said that he grew up "under her wing." He attended Voorhees from ninth through 12th grades, graduating in 1962. During his boyhood, Sellers joined the Boy Scouts of America and attended the 1960 National Scout jamboree in Colorado Springs, Colorado. Although Sellers completed the requirements necessary to become an Eagle Scout, "his paperwork was lost" and he was not formally recognized with the honor until December 3, 2007, at 64 years of age, more than four decades after it was earned. Sellers was presented with a historically correct Eagle Scout medal that would have been awarded in the 1960s at a special Eagle Scout Court of Honor at the 2010 Centennial National Scout Jamboree.

The Sellers family was religious and joined St. Philip's Episcopal Church where Cleveland became enthralled with the sermons and brotherhood he was surrounded by. The murder of Emmett Till when Sellers was only ten years old, shook him deeply. He said "I couldn't see a difference between the two of us." Between the murder of Till and a week-long summer retreat with church leaders who discussed racial inequalities in America, Sellers was mobilized about civil rights. Also propelled by the Greensboro sit-ins, Sellers quickly became dedicated to student-led protesting.

In 1960, in response to the Greensboro sit-ins, Sellers organized a sit-in protest at a Denmark, South Carolina lunch counter. At the age of 15, he was active for the first time with the Civil Rights Movement.

Civil rights activism
In 1962 Sellers enrolled in Howard University. After the 1960 protest, Sellers' father had forbidden his son's jeopardizing himself by becoming an activist. Nevertheless, Sellers became involved with the Nonviolent Action Group (NAG) where he met Stokely Carmichael. Carmichael deeply inspired Sellers as he was like-minded and a prominent face of the movement on campus. Carmichael's house became NAG headquarters, where Malcolm X himself frequented and advocated to students about the idea of black nationalism, which often criticized MLK's entirely peaceful and inclusive stance. Although some were reluctant, it was an interesting concept. Right before the March on Washington, Bayard Rustin, head coordinator of the movement, contacted NAG asking them to supply what they could to the march. Sellers and others supplied signs and food during the march. As sellers walked through the masses at the march, he could hear Malcolm X's message in his ear.

In 1964, Sellers became involved with the Student Non-Violent Coordinating Committee (SNCC). The SNCC was founded in 1960 by students. He was very spiritually disciplined and took an "oath of poverty" after joining, forsaking education, family and pleasures of student life to focus on the movement. He was immediately assigned to Holly Springs, Mississippi, to coordinate voting registration and advocate for the Mississippi Freedom Democratic Party. He and his colleagues were met with intense racism while in Mississippi. When they returned home, they felt beat down and as though nothing had been accomplished. So, when Sellers was elected program director of the SNCC the next year, he quickly took action to revise the goals of the organization.

Sellers thought the philosophical tactics of the SNCC weren't working, and he instead wanted to implement extremely focused and achievable goals for the group. Many group members didn't like the hard crack-down of the organization, but Sellers believed it to be the best way to make a change. Some members of the SNCC, especially Carmichael, began advocating for black empowerment, specifically, black power. Sellers preached, and continues to preach, that the idea of black power was never meant to undermine white people, but simply was a concept meant to empower and celebrate the black community. Still, many white Americans saw black power as a system advocating for black superiority, and by 1967, it had a largely negative reputation. Although SNCC ended up having many critics and eventually disintegrating, the concept of black power sent a "wake up call" to America and allowed some members of the black community to emotionally express feelings of injustice to the community.

Sellers was also one of the first members of SNCC to refuse to be drafted into the U.S. military as a protest against the Vietnam War. The leadership of SNCC thought that the Johnson Administration was trying to silence SNCC by drafting its leadership. Sellers graduated from Shaw University in 1967. After graduation, he returned to South Carolina, drained from the SNCC.

Orangeburg Massacre

Sellers was back in South Carolina in hopes to finish his bachelor degree.
On February 8, 1968, approximately 200 protesters gathered on the campus of South Carolina State University (in the city of Orangeburg) to protest the segregation of the All Star Bowling Lane. Now called All-Star Triangle Bowl, it was a bowling alley on Russell Street, owned by local businessman Harry K. Floyd. Sellers was at a friend's house when he was alerted of the chaos outside. Upon going outdoors, he began walking through the mass of student protestors. 
The surrounding police officers perceived the rowdiness of the crowd as an attack and fired into the crowd, killing three young men: Samuel Hammond, all-state basketball player Delano Middleton, and Henry Smith, and wounding 27 others. Sellers was shot in the left shoulder and fell to the ground.

Then Governor Robert Evander McNair blamed "outside Black Power agitators", but subsequent investigations showed this allegation was without basis.

The ensuing trial, billed as the first federal trial of police officers for using excessive force at a campus protest, led to the acquittal of all nine defendants. Authorities tried to build a case against Sellers claiming he was the instigator. While awaiting criminal trial, Sellers was released on bond and went to Atlanta, out of fear of not being safe at home.

In the fall of 1970, Sellers was convicted of not dispersing when ordered to, and was sentenced to a year in prison.
Sellers was the only individual imprisoned as a result of the incident. He served seven months in prison after a conviction for inciting to riot. It's well believed that Sellers was legally targeted in the initiation of the massacre, having been known as a staunch civil rights advocate and former SNCC leader. Some have a theory that Sellers was actually the target of an assassination plot during the massacre, although this is factually unfounded.

During his imprisonment he wrote his autobiography, The River of No Return, chronicling his involvement with the civil rights movement. Sellers received a full pardon 25 years after his conviction, but he chose not to have his record expunged, keeping it as a "badge of honor." Sellers said that receiving a pardon, "closed a chapter" in his life.

Later life
After his release from prison, Sellers earned a master's degree in education from Harvard University in 1970. He ran unsuccessfully for office in Greensboro, North Carolina while aiding the 1984 presidential campaign of Reverend Jesse Jackson. Sellers earned his Ed.D. in History at the University of North Carolina at Greensboro in 1987.

He served as director of the African American Studies Program at the University of South Carolina. His scholarly interests include recording the history of protest tradition, civil rights history, and the experiences of Africans in the Diaspora. He focuses on the oral history of African Americans who shaped the history of South Carolina, including cultural groupings and the languages of Gullah, Creole, and Geechee. He also has studied the survival experiences of African Americans, sometimes recorded in folklore but often unrecorded.

In 1989, Seller's parents were aging and he and his family moved back to Denmark, South Carolina, to be with them. In 2008, Sellers was selected the 8th president of Voorhees College (Denmark, South Carolina), where he had graduated from high school. In September 2015, Sellers reluctantly stepped down as president because of a heart condition. During his tenure, he helped increase enrollment at the historically black college.

Sellers has two sons and a daughter.

His youngest son is former South Carolina state Rep. Bakari T. Sellers (born September 18, 1984). At the age of 22, B. T. Sellers was one of the youngest state lawmakers in the United States when he was first elected in November 2006.

See also

Timeline of the civil rights movement

References

Further reading

External links
 SNCC Digital Gateway: Cleveland Sellers, Documentary website created by the SNCC Legacy Project and Duke University, telling the story of the Student Nonviolent Coordinating Committee & grassroots organizing from the inside-out
 Civil Rights Greensboro: Cleveland Sellers
 Brian Cabell: "Remembering the 1968 Orangeburg Massacre", February 8, 2001 Web posted at: 4:02 p.m. EST (2102 GMT). Accessed April 1, 2005.
 Jack Bass, "Documenting the Orangeburg Massacre", Neiman Foundation for Journalism, Harvard University. Fall 2003. Accessed April 1, 2005.
 "The Orangeburg Massacre", About.com. Accessed April 1, 2005.
 Linda Meggett Brown, "Remembering the Orangeburg Massacre", Black Issues in Higher Education, March 1, 2001. Accessed April 1, 2005.
 "A Guardian reporter visits the All-Star Triangle Bowl", The Guardian.
Interview with Cleveland Sellers, Democracy Now!'' 2008.
Voorhees: About the President.
Cleveland L. Sellers, Jr. Papers  at Avery Research Center for African American History and Culture.

African-American academics
Heads of universities and colleges in the United States
University of South Carolina faculty
Activists for African-American civil rights
Living people
Harvard University alumni
Howard University alumni
People from Denmark, South Carolina
Gullah
1944 births
Voorhees College
Academics from South Carolina
21st-century African-American people
20th-century African-American people
Student Nonviolent Coordinating Committee
American shooting survivors